Armin Karima is an Iranian/British actor known for his role as Abdul Bukhari in BBC Waterloo Road, Ant in IBoy, Kasim Al-Yazbek in FOX series Tyrant and Malek Amir in Netflix series Sex Education.

Career 
While training Karima booked his first role, short film TAG for BBC IPlayer. Just before his last college performance Karima landed a regular role in Waterloo Road's final series (10) as Abdul Bukhari. Karima was then cast alongside Shahab Hosseini in feature film Gholam in 2015.
He then appeared in Tyrant series 2 as Kasim Al-Yazbek in 2016. Karima then landed a role in BBC Moving on as Safi in 2016. In 2017 Karima played the role of Ant in Netflix's IBoy. Shortly after he landed a role in Fearless for ITV.

Filmography

References 
 http://www.digitalspy.com/soaps/waterloo-road/news/a627512/waterloo-roads-armin-karima-teases-abdul-shock-he-breaks-down/
 http://www.identityschoolofacting.com/portfolio/armin-karima-2/
 http://www.bbc.co.uk/programmes/p00xngb2/p02g180l

External links 
 

British male actors of Asian descent
Living people
Year of birth missing (living people)